Phellodendron chinense is a plant species in the genus Phellodendron.

The isocoumarin derivative 3-acetyl-3,4-dihydro-5,6-dimethoxy-1H-2-benzopyran-1-one can be found in Huáng bǎi (P. chinense), one of the fifty fundamental herbs of traditional Chinese medicine.

See also
 Huáng bǎi
 Sān miáo wán

References

External links

Zanthoxyloideae
Plants described in 1907